Saltinho Biological Reserve is a Biological Reserve near Tamandaré in the state of  Pernambuco, Brazil.
It contains a sample of the tropical Atlantic Forest biome.

History

The reserve lies in the Rio Formoso and Tamandaré municipalities of Pernambuco.
It is managed by the Chico Mendes Institute for Biodiversity Conservation.
Objectives included protecting rare, endemic and threatened species of native flora and fauna, helping preserve and restore the Atlantic Forest in the state, and supporting scientific research.

Location

The terrain is coastal plain of sedimentary origin, with small hills and ridges.
The soils are very deep and well-drained.
The Saltinho river, after which the reserve is named, originates a few kilometres upstream from the reserve, and is dammed in the reserve to supply water to the city of Tamandaré.

Status

Protected species include oncilla (Leopardus tigrinus), ocelot (Leopardus pardalis), the shrimp Atya scabra, and the birds Willis's antbird (Cercomacroides laeta), white-eyed foliage-gleaner (Automolus leucophthalmus), black-cheeked gnateater (Conopophaga melanops), rufous gnateater (Conopophaga lineata), blue-crowned motmot (Momotus momota), scalloped antbird (Myrmeciza ruficauda), great-billed hermit (phaethornis malaris), white-shouldered antshrike (Thamnophilus aethiops) and long-tailed woodnymph (Thalurania watertonii).

References

Sources

Biological reserves of Brazil
Protected areas of Pernambuco
Protected areas of the Atlantic Forest
1983 establishments in Brazil
Protected areas established in 1983